Zinc finger protein with KRAB and SCAN domains 5 is a protein that in humans is encoded by the ZKSCAN5 gene. The protein contains a SCAN box and a KRAB A domain.

A similar protein in mice is differentially expressed in spermatogenesis. Two alternatively spliced transcript variants differing only in the five prime untranslated region (5' UTR) have been described. Additional variants have been found, but their full-length sequences have not been determined.

References

Further reading